Knyazevo is a rural locality (a village) in Irnykshinsky Selsoviet, Arkhangelsky District, Bashkortostan, Russia. The population was 20 as of 2010. There are 10 streets.

Geography 
Knyazevo is located 24 km northwest of Arkhangelskoye (the district's administrative centre) by road. Kuyashkino is the nearest rural locality.

References 

Rural localities in Arkhangelsky District